is a Japanese fantasy light novel series written by Shin Araki and illustrated by Haruyuki Morisawa. Shueisha have published twelve volumes since January 2015 under their Dash X Bunko imprint. A manga adaptation with art by Takashi Minakuchi titled Eiyū Kyōshitsu: Honoo no Empress was serialized in Shueisha's seinen manga magazine Ultra Jump between February and August 2015 and was collected in a single tankōbon volume. A second manga adaptation with art by Koara Kishida titled as the light novel has been serialized via Square Enix's shōnen manga magazine Monthly Shōnen Gangan since September 2016. It has been collected in fifteen tankōbon volumes. The second manga is licensed digitally in North America by Comikey. An anime television series adaptation by Actas is set to premiere in 2023.

Characters

Media

Light novel

Manga
A manga adaptation with art by Takashi Minakuchi titled  was serialized in Shueisha's seinen manga magazine Ultra Jump between February and August 2015 and was collected in a single tankōbon volume.

A second manga adaptation with art by Koara Kishida titled as the light novel began serialization in Square Enix's Monthly Shōnen Gangan magazine on September 12, 2016. It has been collected in fourteen tankōbon volumes. The second manga adaptation is licensed digitally in North America by Comikey.

Anime
An anime television series adaptation was announced on the twelfth volume of the light novel on September 24, 2021. It is produced by Actas and directed by Keiichiro Kawaguchi, with Naoki Hayashi writing the scripts and Kosuke Kawamura designing the characters. It is set to premiere in 2023.

See also
GJ Club — another light novel series by the same author

References

External links
 
 
 

2015 Japanese novels
2023 anime television series debuts
Actas
Anime and manga based on light novels
Book series introduced in 2015
Dash X Bunko
Fantasy anime and manga
Gangan Comics manga
Light novels
Seinen manga
Shōnen manga
Shueisha books
Shueisha franchises
Shueisha manga
Slice of life anime and manga
Upcoming anime television series